The Chicago Prairie Football League  is a high school football only conference in northern Illinois. The conference participates in the Illinois High School Association. The conference includes five small public and three small private high schools, with enrollments between 150 and 950 students in Cook, DuPage, LaSalle, Livingston, and Will counties.

Origins 
The Chicago Prairie Football League has roots in the new Vermilion Valley Conference within the state of Illinois.

For football, the Vermilion Valley was divided into two divisions with six teams each, North and South. The north included Iroquois West and Watseka from the Vermilion Valley, Seneca and Dwight (coop) from the Tri-County Conference and Clifton Central and Momence High Schools from the River Valley Conference. Whereas the south included Bismarck-Henning-Rossville-Alvin, Salt Fork, Oakwood, Westville, Hoopeston Area (coop), and Georgetown-Ridge Farm (coop), all from the Vermilion Valley.

Due to travel time and distance between schools, the Chicago Prairie Football League formed with Dwight, St. Bede, Ottawa Marquette and Seneca coming from the Tri-County as well as Elmwood Park, Ridgewood and Westmont from the Metro Suburban and Walther Christian from the Northeastern Athletic to make up the newly formed 8-team conference tentatively named the Chicago Prairie Football League (CPFL).

All-time membership

Sources:IHSA Conferences, and IHSA Member Schools Directory

References

External links

High school sports in Illinois
Illinois high school sports conferences